The South and Central American Beach Handball Championship is the official competition for Men's and Women's Beach handball national teams of the South and Central America Handball Confederation.

Men

Summary

Medal table

Participating nations

Women

Summary

Medal table

Participating nations

References

External links
 Coscabal official website

Recurring sporting events established in 2019
Beach handball competitions
South and Central America Handball Confederation competitions